Stéphanie Hennette-Vauchez (born 25 December 1972) is a professor of human rights law at the University of Paris-Nanterre. She has directed the Center for Research and Studies on Fundamental Rights (CREDOF) since 2015. Her research focuses on bioethics, gender, theory, and sociology of human rights.

Life 
Stéphanie Hennette is a graduate of the Paris Institute of Political Studies (Sciences Po), and of the Panthéon-Sorbonne University. In 2000, she defended a thesis under the supervision of Professor Étienne Picard entitled “The rights of the person over their body around the moment of death: contribution to the theoretical analysis of the legal validity of rights”. She was a Fulbright Fellow at Northwestern University.

From 2002 to 2007, she was a professor at the Paris-East Créteil University. From 2007 to 2010, she took advantage of the European Marie Skłodowska-Curie research program, to study at the Robert Schuman Center of the European University Institute. In 2013, she was a visiting professor at Princeton University.

In 2010, she became a professor of law at the University of Paris-Nanterre, and directs the second year of the master's degree in Human Rights. From 2011 to 2015, she was co-leader for the Research and studies project on gender and inequalities in norms in Europe (REGINE). From 2011 to 2018, she was a member of the Scientific Council of the Institut Émilie-du-Châtelet on women, gender and sexuality. From 2012 to 2015, she was a member of the French National Centre for Scientific Research (CNRS), and since 2012 has chaired the Scientific Council of the Law & Justice research mission.

Since 2015, she has been president of the Center for Research and Studies on Fundamental Rights (CREDOF) at the University of Nanterre. In 2020, she is a member of the scientific committee of the QPC 2020 research project, studying the question of constitutionality for the Constitutional Council. She intervened in the public debate to alert about the risk of integrating exceptional measures of a state of emergency into common law, and called for respect for fundamental rights and human rights in France.

Works 
 Stéphanie Hennette, Thomas Piketty, Guillaume Sacriste et Antoine Vauchez, Pour un traité de démocratisation de l'Europe, Paris, Seuil, 2016
 R. Encinas, C. Herrera, O. Leclerc, S. Hennette, L'analyse juridique de (x). Le droit parmi les sciences sociales, Kimé, 2016
 Stéphanie Hennette-Vauchez et Vincent Valentin, L'affaire Baby Loup ou la Nouvelle Laïcité, Lextenso, 2014
 Stéphanie Hennette-Vauchez, Le droit de la bioéthique, La Découverte, coll. « Repères » (no 541), 2009
 Stéphanie Hennette-Vauchez, Disposer de soi ? Une analyse du discours juridique sur les droits de la personne sur son corps, L'Harmattan, 2004
 Stéphanie Hennette-Vauchez, La démocratie en état d'urgence : Quand l’exception devient permanente, Le Seuil, 2022, 224 p.

References 

Living people
1972 births
Human rights lawyers
French jurists
French women scientists
Paris-Sorbonne University alumni